The 1924 United States presidential election in Washington took place on November 4, 1924. All contemporary forty-eight states took part of the 1924 United States presidential election, and Washington's voters selected seven voters to the Electoral College, who voted for president and vice president.

Rapid recovery of the economy from a sharp recession following World War I transformed the 1920s into a strongly Republican decade. Even the problematic issue of a farm depression had eased by the time of the election as prices recovered. It was also widely thought that the Teapot Dome scandal could do nothing to revive the Democrats as they were well known to have equally severe problems therewith via the fact that recently deceased Woodrow Wilson had paid one hundred and fifty thousand dollars in legal fees to nomination frontrunner William McAdoo.

The conservatism of Democratic nominee John W. Davis – the first presidential nominee since the American Civil War from an antebellum slave state and the only one ever from West Virginia – led those with more progressive views to desert the two major parties for the third-party candidacy of Progressive "Fighting Bob" La Follette. His campaign, based on improved labor laws, an end to US involvement in the politics of Latin America, and cheap credit for farmers, had major appeal in the West, and in Washington State La Follette won five of thirty-nine counties (including absolute majorities in the eastern counties of Franklin and Adams) and finished ahead of Davis in every county except far southeastern Garfield County and Columbia County.

Results

Results by county

See also
 United States presidential elections in Washington (state)

Notes

References

Washington
1924
1924 Washington (state) elections